Harrison Township is the name of twenty-four townships in the U.S. state of Indiana:

 Harrison Township, Bartholomew County, Indiana
 Harrison Township, Blackford County, Indiana
 Harrison Township, Boone County, Indiana
 Harrison Township, Cass County, Indiana
 Harrison Township, Clay County, Indiana
 Harrison Township, Daviess County, Indiana
 Harrison Township, Dearborn County, Indiana
 Harrison Township, Delaware County, Indiana
 Harrison Township, Elkhart County, Indiana
 Harrison Township, Fayette County, Indiana
 Harrison Township, Harrison County, Indiana
 Harrison Township, Henry County, Indiana
 Harrison Township, Howard County, Indiana
 Harrison Township, Knox County, Indiana
 Harrison Township, Kosciusko County, Indiana
 Harrison Township, Miami County, Indiana
 Harrison Township, Morgan County, Indiana
 Harrison Township, Owen County, Indiana
 Harrison Township, Pulaski County, Indiana
 Harrison Township, Spencer County, Indiana
 Harrison Township, Union County, Indiana
 Harrison Township, Vigo County, Indiana
 Harrison Township, Wayne County, Indiana
 Harrison Township, Wells County, Indiana

Indiana township disambiguation pages